Korovino is a rural locality (a selo) in Danilovskoye Rural Settlement, Melenkovsky District, Vladimir Oblast, Russia. The population was 326 as of 2010. There are 6 streets.

Geography 
Korovino is located 11 km northwest of Melenki (the district's administrative centre) by road. Ratnovo is the nearest rural locality.

References 

Rural localities in Melenkovsky District
Melenkovsky Uyezd